"Faît Accompli" is the first single from the album Doppelgänger by alternative rock band Curve. It was released on 24 February 1992; it reached #22 in the UK singles chart, becoming their highest-charting single in the UK. It was one of the first singles in the UK to reach the Top 40 without a release on 7" vinyl. "Faît Accompli" (extended extended extended) was included in the compilation Pubic Fruit, issued in 1992.

"Faît Accompli" was selected as Single of the Week by Melody Maker.

Track listing Faît Accompli

12" & CD
"Faît Accompli" – 4:10
"Arms Out" – 4:45
"Sigh" – 3:49

MC
"Faît Accompli" – 4:10
"Arms Out" – 4:45

Track listing Faît Accompli (Extended mix)

12"
"Faît Accompli" (extended extended extended) – 6:24
"Coast Is Clear" (live Manchester '91) – 4:34
"Die Like a Dog" (live London '91) – 4:39

Music video
The video for "Faît Accompli" features the official and the touring members of the band performing this song in a room. It was filmed in black and white.

Credits
 Written by Toni Halliday and Dean Garcia
 Produced by Curve and Flood
 Mixed by Alan Moulder assisted by Dick Meenhey
 Tracks 2 and 3 produced and mixed by Curve
 Design and photography by Flat Earth

Charts

References

1992 debut singles
Curve (band) songs
1992 songs
Song recordings produced by Flood (producer)
Songs written by Dean Garcia
Songs written by Toni Halliday